Big Brother Norge was the Norwegian version of reality TV show Big Brother that was aired from 2001 to 2003 on TV Norge for four moderately successful seasons. The fifth and final season was launched in late August 2011 on TV 2 Bliss.

Overall

Big Brother 1 
Season 1 of Big Brother Norge premiered on February 24, 2001 and ran until May 31, 2001. 10 housemates entered the house on launch night with two Intruders immediately following on the second day of the Show. The original housemates then had to decide whom of Natalie and Roy they wanted to keep in the house. Natalie was evicted. First victim of the public voting was Rebekka, who eventually made a return to the show as one of the twists of the season. When Per Morten made the shows only voluntary exit on Day 85 the audience had the chance to vote yet another former evictee back into the house. Since Rebekka already returned and Natalie not recognized as an official housemate by Big Brother (they put her profile off the homepage once she was evicted) the audience had to choose out of Trond, Mónica, Roy and Rodney. With massive support, the latest evictee Rodney was allowed to make a comeback.
Two showmances had huge impact on the show since both resulting couples (Annette and Rodney; Anne Mona and Ramsy) remained in the house until the last week. However it was Lars Joakim Ringom who gained the most popularity and was crowned the winner of the season in a close vote beating runner-up Anita E. Sundt Olsen by 2% only. Both housemates have been quite popular and have never been nominated.
Annette Young, who gained the 3rd runner-up position on final night, eventually became a co-host of future Big Brother Norge seasons.
This was the first time that the rules of a Big Brother edition were changed to a minimum of three housemates being up for eviction on every nomination round in comparison to the usual two.

Nominations Table 
Housemates nominate for 2 points (top of box) and 1 point (bottom of box) and the three or more housemates with the most nomination points face the public vote to evict.

Notes:
 On Day 2 two new Housemates, Natalie and Roy, entered the House. On Day Four the Housemates had to decide which one of them to evict, and Natalie left the House after receiving the most votes.
 Rebekka returned to the House on Day 65.
 On Day 85 Per Morten left the House voluntarily. He was facing Eviction along with Anne Mona and Rebekka, but all votes for him were discounted and the Eviction left between Anne Mona and Rebekka, with Rebekka leaving after receiving 53% to Anne Mona's 47%. Viewers voted for which Ex-Housemate they wanted to replace Per Morten. They voted for Rodney who re-entered the House on Day 86, shortly after Rebekka's second Eviction. Rodney was chosen with 56% of the vote, to Trond's 17%, Monica's 14% and Roy's 13%.
 There were no Nominations this Week, instead all Housemates faced the vote to win.

Big Brother Norge - Tilbake I Huset 
Big Brother Norge - Tilbake I Huset (Back In The House) was a spin-off of the first season which was set 100 days after that seasons final and lasted 9 days running from November 17 to November 25, 2001. Several season 1 housemates re-entered the house together with four new personalities: Annika, Christian, Claus and Leena, who competed to become a housemate on the shows next regular season. Since Claus made a voluntary exit halfway through the audience had to choose between the remaining three and voted Leena (real name: Lina) Breeke the winner who was therefore the first known housemate for the next season.
The main highlight of the show was the wedding between season 1 houseguests Ramsy and Mona which marked the first time worldwide that a couple would marry inside a Big Brother house. Boyband Westlife made an appearance as live guests during the wedding and performed.

Contestants

Big Brother 2 
The second season of Big Brother Norge started on February 24, 2002 and ended on June 2 of the same year. As it was decided on Tilbake I Huset, Leena Brekke, now under her real name Lina, was already certain to move into the house together with 11 others on launch night. Juse like in the other year, two intruders made their way to the house on Day 2: Gro Anita and Espen. Both of them were automatically up for eviction, however, next to them two of the original housemates who received the most nominations, Jan Arne and Verónica were also in danger of leaving the house on what was a double elimination in the very first week. Jan Arne and Gro Anita, whose stay in the house only lasted for 2 days, got evicted.
Although being elected by the public to enter the house, Lina found herself in the unlucky position to get nominated by Big Brother in week 2 and immediately getting the boot out of five nominated housemates.
After 99 Days, Verónica Agnes Roso from Lørenskog was voted the winner over Espen Vesterdal Larsen and three others. Both Verónica and Espen have been up for eviction in the very first week and Verónica got nominated even 5 out of the 8 nomination rounds.

Nominations Table 

Notes:
 Line and Verónika-Kathrin were automatically nominated for discussing nominations.
 Lise-Marie and Kristian were automatically nominated for cheating in the weekly task.
 There were no Nominations this Week, instead all Housemates faced the vote to win.

Big Brother 3 - Next Generation 
Under the Name Big Brother Norge - Next Generation the show returned in its third year running from March 8 to May 15, 2003. Running for only 69 days, it was the shortest main season of the show and saw a major twist in a house divide which was already used in several Big Brother versions worldwide before: The household was split into two parts with one living on the luxurious side of the house having access to privileges like a jacuzzi, hot water and comfort beds while the other side was lacking of all of this and was forced to live with basics only.
In this edition, the audience got the chance to nominate their two most disliked housemates with the most vote getter receiving two, and the 2nd most vote getter receiving one point for nomination.
Although lasting for only ten weeks the season saw the most voluntary exits in the history of Big Brother Norge with three male housemates walking and therefore making place for three replacement contestants.
With 39.4% to win Eva Lill Baukhol triumphed over Halvor Kvikstad, who achieved 36.4% in a close race.
Three years after his participation contestant Ronny Furnes was found dead on May 30, 2007 at the age of 37.

Nominations table

Big Brother 4 
The series started on Monday 29 August 2011, and was aired on TV 2 Bliss for 98 days with the finale on 4 December 2011. TV2 bought the Norwegian television rights for Big Brother and will air a fourth season in 2011. The main presenters are Petter Pilgaard and Sarah Natasha Melbye. Tine Barstad won series on 4 December 2011.

Housemates

Nominations table

Ratings

See also 
 Big Brother (TV series)

References

External links
Official Website: http://www.tv2.no/bigbrother/
Official Facebook: http://www.facebook.com/bigbrotherbliss
World of Big Brother

2001 Norwegian television series debuts
Norway
2011 Norwegian television series endings
Norwegian reality television series